Rihsitilla Abdullaev ,   (born April 5, 1978) is an Uzbek theater and film actor and TV presenter.

Life 
 Abdullaev Rihsitilla Nigmatullayevich was born on April 5, 1978, in Tashkent, the capital of Uzbekistan. He graduated from school number 272 in Tashkent. In 1995, he entered the Uzbekistan State Institute of Arts and Culture, Department of Drama and Film Acting. He later received a master's degree from the same university. The Uzbek National Academic Drama Theater  has been operating since 1999. Rihsitilla created unique images in more than 50 performances between 1999-2021. In 2011, he received the "Best  TV presenter of the Year" award in Uzbekistan. Rihsitilla Abdullaev gained wide recognition and fame in Uzbekistan in 2006 after starring in the Uzbek drama film "Soʼgʼdiyona".

Sevgi series are based on life events in 2020. The series opened new pages in the Uzbek series and brought a lot of attention to Avdullayev. Abdullayevʻs Ishq o'yinlari series, shot in collaboration with Turkish artists, brought him great fame

Education 
 1985-1995 - a student of the 272 nd comprehensive school of Yunusabad district of Tashkent.
 1995-1999 a student of the  Uzbekistan State Institute of Arts and Culture
 2004-2006   He graduated from the Uzbekistan State Institute of Arts and Culture with a master's degree.

Personal life 
In 2002, Rihsitilla Abdullaev married Nodira Abdullaeva (Ahmedova), the daughter of People's Artist of Uzbekistan Yoqub Ahmedov. They now have 3 children

Children 
 Tojirahmon Negmatullaev was born in October 19, 2003 in Tashkent
 Asilzoda Negmatullayeva 2008 29-September Toshkent was born in.
 Mohizoda Negmatullaeva 2009 30-November  Toshkent was born in.

Filmography 
Below is a chronologically ordered list of films in which Rihsitilla Abdullaev has appeared.

Series

Performances

Television
 Oydin hayot (Oʻzbekiston, 2007-2018)
 Oltin kalit (Milliy TV, 2019-2020)

Awards 
 In 2010, he was awarded the Badge of Uzbekistan.
 2011 The best TV presenter of the year
 30th anniversary of independence of Uzbekistan.

References

External links 

 
 Rihsitilla Abdullaev Instagram
 Rihsitilla AbdullaevFacebook

1978 births
Living people
Uzbeks
Uzbekistani male film actors
Uzbekistani television presenters
21st-century Uzbekistani male singers
21st-century Uzbekistani male actors